Étréchy may refer to the following places in France:

Étréchy, Cher, a commune in the department of Cher
Étréchy, Marne, a commune in the department of Marne
Étréchy, Essonne, a commune in the department of Essonne